The Synod of Evangelical Lutheran Churches (SELC) was an American Lutheran denomination that existed from 1902 to 1971. It merged with the Lutheran Church–Missouri Synod (LCMS) in 1971 and now operates as the non-geographic SELC District of that body.

History
In 1894, Slovak Lutheran immigrants in Pennsylvania formed a short-live synod. Three conferences that stressed confessional Lutheran identity were later held in Wilkes-Barre (1899) and Braddock, Pennsylvania (1900 and 1902). As a result of these conferences, the denomination was founded at St. Peter's Church in Connellsville, Pennsylvania, on September 2–4, 1902, as the Slovak Evangelical Lutheran Church of the Augsburg Confession in the United States of America (Slovenská evanjelická celocirkev augsburgského vyznania v Spojenych štátoch amerických). At its origin, the denomination had ten clergymen and 15 congregations. Most congregations were composed of recent immigrants, and liturgies were usually conducted in Slovak. Those Slovak Lutherans who did not join the SELC eventually formed the Slovak Zion Synod in 1919.

The name was changed in 1913 to Slovak Evangelical Lutheran Synod of the United States of America. In 1945, the name was shortened to Slovak Evangelical Lutheran Church. By 1959, the use of Slovak as a primary liturgical language had died out and the denomination was renamed the Synod of Evangelical Lutheran Churches, thereby retaining SELC as its acronym.

The SELC joined the Evangelical Lutheran Synodical Conference of North America in 1910, and was one of the two remaining members of that federation (the LCMS being the other) when it was dissolved in 1967. The SELC was a founding member of the Lutheran Council in the United States of America, which began operations on January 1, 1967.

In 1971, during its convention held at Zion Lutheran Church in Clark, New Jersey, the SELC officially merged with the Lutheran Church–Missouri Synod, becoming the SELC District, one of two non-geographic districts of the LCMS. The district retained the initials "SELC" in its name to mark its origins and heritage.

, the SELC District has 52 congregations in 11 U.S. states and 2 Canadian provinces and has 13,876 baptized members and 11,239 communicants. The district's congregations are concentrated in the Northeastern and Midwestern United States.

Presidents of SELC
The SELC had ten presidents during its existence as an independent synod.

Daniel Jonaten Záboj Laucek 1902–1905
John Pelikán 1905–1913
Stephen Tuhy 1913–1919
J. Pelikán 1919–1921
John Somora 1921–1922
John Samuel Bradác 1922–1939
Andrew Daniel 1939–1949
Paul Rafaj 1949–1963
John Kovac 1963–1969
Milan A. Ontko 1969–1971

Membership statistics

References

External links 
Official website of the SELC District of the Lutheran Church–Missouri Synod

Lutheran denominations in North America
Former Lutheran denominations
Lutheran Church–Missouri Synod
Christian organizations established in 1902
Slovak-American history